Jeremiah Gurney (October 17, 1812 – April 21, 1895), was an American daguerreotype photographer operating in New York.

Biography
Gurney worked in the jewelry trade in Saratoga, New York, but learned about the daguerreotype from Samuel Morse, took up photography, and after moving to New York City, began selling photographs alongside jewelry from his shop. Different sources call him either the owner of the first photographic gallery in America and second practitioner after Morse, or merely one of the earliest practitioners in New York City and "one of the first" photographic galleries on Broadway. 

The Metropolitan Museum of Art credits his success to him "producing the finest daguerreotypes in  Gotham", and praises his "tonally delicate, startlingly three-dimensional portraits" such as his "Two Girls in Identical Dresses". A Scientific American article, reviewing an 1853 photographic display at the Crystal Palace in London praises American photographers and calls out the "exquisite taste and skill displayed in the pictures of Gurney and others" at the exposition.  

Photographer of the American Civil War Mathew B. Brady was a journeyman in the firm that made the cases for Gurney's shop, and was inspired to enter photography by Gurney's success, starting up a rival firm.

One of the things Gurney is best known for is having taken the only known photograph of Abraham Lincoln in death.

Gallery

References

Bibliography
 Peterson, Christian A. Chaining the Sun: Portraits by Jeremiah Gurney, University of Minnesota Press (1999)

External links

The Metropolitan Museum of Art
The Memoirs of Jeremiah Gurney
Private Gurney Collection at Alphonse Gallery

Pioneers of photography
American portrait photographers
1812 births
1895 deaths
Photographers from New York City
People from Little Falls, New York
19th-century American photographers